Ataenius imbricatus is a species of aphodiine dung beetle in the family Scarabaeidae. It is found in the Caribbean, Central America, North America, and South America.

References

Further reading

External links

 
 

Scarabaeidae
Articles created by Qbugbot
Beetles described in 1845